The Gulf of California Rift Zone (GCRZ) is the northernmost extension of the East Pacific Rise which extends some  from the mouth of the Gulf of California to the southern terminus of the San Andreas Fault at the Salton Sink.

The GCRZ is an incipient rift zone akin to the Red Sea Rift. In the GCRZ  continental crust originally associated with the North American Plate has been pulled apart by tectonic forces and is being replaced by newly formed oceanic crust and seafloor spreading.  The rifting has resulted in the transfer of the Baja California Peninsula to the Pacific Plate.

List of GCRZ transform faults

From north to south:

 Imperial Fault Zone
 Cerro Prieto Fault
 Ballenas Fault
 Partida Fault
 San Lorenzo Fault
 Guaymas Fault
 Carmen Fault
 Farallon Fault
 Atl Fault
 Pescadero Fault
 Tamayo Fault

List of GCRZ rift basins

From north to south:
 Brawley Seismic Zone
 Cerro Prieto
 Wagner Basin
 Consag Basin
 Adair-Tepoca Basin
 Tiburon Basin
 Delfin Basin
 San Pedro Martir Basin
 Guaymas Basin
 Carmen Basin
 Farallon Basin
 Pescadero Basin
 Alarcon Basin

References
 Clayton, W.R. & Trampert, J. & Rebollar, C. & Ritsema, Jeroen & Persaud, Patricia & Paulssen, J.A.M. & Pérez-Campos, Xyoli & Wettum, A. & Perez-Vertti, A. & DiLuccio, F.. (2004). The NARS-Baja seismic array in the Gulf of California rift zone. MARGINS Newslett. 13. 

Rift Zone
Geology of Mexico
Salton Trough
Seismic faults of North America